WCRN is an AM radio station in Worcester, Massachusetts, owned by Carter Broadcasting. The station broadcasts at 830 AM with a transmitter power output of 50,000 watts and can be heard from Maine to Providence, Rhode Island, and from Boston to Springfield, Massachusetts (during the day). The signal is directional, pointed away from such other stations at 830 kHz as WCCO in Minneapolis, Minnesota. After sunset, WCRN's signal is made further directional towards the east; as a result, it is not clearly audible in Western Massachusetts after sunset.

The station bills itself as "Full Service", with a talk radio format. The station simulcasts news from WFXT (channel 25) in the mornings, airs locally-based brokered programming in middays, and runs music from the 1960s, 1970s, and 1980s at night as "North Star Music".

The station is owned by the Carberry family, who also own WACE in Chicopee, Massachusetts. Kurt Carberry is the vice president and general manager.

History

WCRN signed on December 5, 1994, carrying religious programming from the Carter Radio Network, based out of then-sister station WROL in Boston.  In December 2000, this was abandoned in favor of a big band format, "Swing 830".  The format was changed to oldies, via ABC Radio's The True Oldies Channel, in August 2004, and then to the current talk format on May 8, 2006.

In 2000, the station was allowed to increase its daytime power from 5,000 watts to the current 50,000 watts. Nighttime power was also increased from 5,000 watts to 50,000 watts on April 4, 2007, just in time for the first Boston Red Sox night game of the season.

WCRN was the flagship for the Worcester Tornadoes independent-league baseball team during the 2005 and 2010 seasons.  The station is also an affiliate of the University of Massachusetts Amherst network for football and men's basketball broadcasts.

From 2007 through 2009, and since 2011, WCRN has shared the Worcester affiliation of the Boston Red Sox Radio Network with WEEI/WEEI-FM satellite station WVEI, an arrangement made in order to take advantage of WCRN's then-new 50,000-watt night signal to serve areas of MetroWest that had difficulty receiving either WVEI itself or the team's then-flagship, WRKO, particularly at night (when most Red Sox games are played), with WVEI selling local advertising on both stations.  The two stations replaced WTAG, which had carried Sox games for 40 years.  WVEI became the sole Red Sox affiliate in Worcester in 2010, but WCRN returned to the Red Sox network in 2011.

References

External links

CRN
News and talk radio stations in the United States
Radio stations established in 1994
1994 establishments in Massachusetts